The Switzerland men's national squash team represents Switzerland in international squash team competitions, and is governed by Swiss Squash.

Since 1987, Switzerland has participated in a round of 16 of the World Squash Team Open, in 2003

Current team
 Nicolas Müller
 Reiko Peter
 Benjamin Fischer
 Lukas Burkhart
 Patrick Miescher

Results

World Team Squash Championships

European Squash Team Championships

See also 
 Swiss Squash
 World Team Squash Championships

References 

Squash teams
Men's national squash teams
Squash
Men's sport in Switzerland
Squash in Switzerland